The Silent River Film Festival (SRFF) held annually, is a non-profit organization based in Irvine, California, USA,  south of Hollywood. In its third year, it is a program of the Silent River film and Literary Society, focussed on promoting the art of cinema and literature.

Background
Founded in 2011 by filmmaker, actor and poet Kalpna Singh-Chitnis, SRFF is Irvine's first international film festival, dedicated to global independent filmmakers. Since its beginning in 2011, the festival has showcased over 160 films from 30 countries, premiering some of the highly acclaimed films and documentaries such as I Am Kalam by Nila Madhab Panda, The Highest Pass by Jon Fitzgerald, Oscar nominated short Raju (film) by Max Zahle, No God No Master by Terry Green, Unbowed by Chung ji-young, English Vinglish by Gauri Shinde, How I Became An Elephant by Tim Gorski and studio films from Walt Disney, UTV and Eros International. SRFF is established with the vision to bring East and West together to share their best work of films and Cinema for Causes on one platform to raise awareness about the issues that matters.

Cinema for Causes
Cinema for Causes platform is known for introducing Cinecause a film festival founded by Jon Fitzgerald, one of the co-founders of Slamdance Film Festival and documentaries like When the Dragon Swallowed the Sun and How I Became an Elephant both winning the best documentary award at the festival's first year.

Official Selections

2012 Film Screenings

Narrative Features

Documentary Features

Feature Animations

2011 Film Screenings

Narrative Features

Documentary features

Awards
Each year, awards are presented to recognize filmmakers for their work and contribution to the world of cinema.  The Silent River Film Festival award winner's list includes:
Oscar-nominated actor David Strathairn, CSI star Jorja Fox, Ahn Sung-ki, Toby Kebbell from Prince of Persia: The Sands of Time, The Sorcerer's Apprentice, War Horse; Jon Fitzgerald (founder of Slamdance, Santa Barbara and Cinecause film festivals),  Arjan Lulla (Founder - Eros International), Babu Subramaniam of ER, Outsourced fame, Jaya Bachchan from Meherjaan, Chung ji-young (Unbowed), Rohit Gupta's Life! Camera Action..., Jean Marie Benjamin's Tariq Aziz: The other Truth,  Abby Sunderland's Abby Sunderland Story, Juliette West's How I Became An Elephant) and many others.

References

Film festivals in California
Tourist attractions in Orange County, California
Culture of Irvine, California
Indian-American culture in California
2011 establishments in California